The 1987 Bintaro train accident occurred in Pondok Betung urban village, Bintaro, South Jakarta, Indonesia on Monday 19 October 1987. Two passenger trains collided, causing 139 fatalities, making it the worst railway crash in Indonesia to date.

A train departing from Rangkasbitung Station in West Java province (currently in Banten) collided with a train from Tanah Abang Station in Jakarta. The investigation indicated negligence from a station officer who gave a safe signal to the train from Rangkasbitung without confirmation from Kebayoran Station. The safe signal was given because the lines at Sudimara Station were crowded.

Location 
The accident happened between Pondok Ranji Station and Tanah Kusir Cemetery, north of Public High School 86, Jakarta, near the Bintaro Highway curve, about  after the Pondok Betung crossing and  before Sudimara Station.

Accident 
The Serpong Stationmaster permitted KA 225 to leave for Sudimara Station without checking the railway condition at Sudimara Station. When the diesel-hydraulic train, KA 225 Rangkasbitung-Jakarta Kota, arrived in Sudimara Station at 6:45 AM (GMT+7) on 19 October 1987, the lanes were all filled with KA 225 in the first lane, KA Indocement in the second lane and a headless freight train.

KA 225 was intended to pass KA 220 Patas from Kebayoran to Merak. That meant KA 220 Patas at Kebayoran Station received lower priority for departure. Djamhari, the Sudimara Stationmaster, ordered KA 225's engineer to move his train to the first lane. This order were misinterpreted by the engineer as a go-ahead to continue the journey (compounded by an illegal boarder who hurriedly and wrongly confirms the engineer), and began to move the train. 

Five minutes later, Djamhari was telephoned by Umrihadi, the officer from Kebayoran Lama Station, informing him that KA 220 Tanah Abang-Merak had departed for Sudimara. Djamhari, shocked seeing KA 225 leaving the station, tried in vain to chase KA 225 while waving the red flag as the train moved at 50km/h. A switcher boarded the rearmost carriage who tries to make it through the train and warn the engineer, to no avail due to the crowded condition. The two crowded trains collided head-on at Km +18.75, causing serious damage. Both locomotives, Henschel-built BB303 and BB306, were also heavily damaged. The death toll came to 139 people, while hundreds more were injured.

Criminal sanctions
The driver of KA 225, Slamet Suradio, survived the crash and was charged with negligence causing death. He received the maximum penalty of 5 years, which he felt was unfair as he was only following the Stationmaster's instructions. He received no pension, despite more than 20 years of work for the rail company. Upon release, he returned to his hometown of Purworejo in Central Java province and became a cigarette seller. 

Adung Syafei, the conductor of KA 225, was sentenced 2 years and 6 months in prison. Umrihadi of Kebayoran Lama Station was 10 months in prison.

In popular culture
Iwan Fals wrote a song titled "19/10", referencing the date of the crash. Ebiet G. Ade was inspired by the disaster to write a song "Masih Ada Waktu" ("There's Still Time").
A film based on the collision, Tragedi Bintaro, was released in 1989.

References

External links 
 Location map
 Bintaro Tragedy on film

Bintaro train crash
Accidents and incidents involving Kereta Api Indonesia
Banten
Bintaro train crash
Train collisions in Indonesia
Bintaro train crash
Bintaro train crash